Megachile mossambica is a species of bee in the family Megachilidae. It was described by Gribodo in 1895.

References

Mossambica
Insects described in 1895